Ombrophobe or ombrophobous/ombrophobic plant (from Greek ὄμβρος - ombros, "storm of rain" and φόβος - phobos, "fear") is a plant that cannot withstand much rain. The term was introduced by the 19th-century botanist Julius Wiesner, who identified the two extreme kinds of plants, ombrophobes and ombrophiles. Xerophytes are usually ombrophobous.

References

Plant physiology